Drill is a subgenre of hip hop music that originated in Chicago in the early 2010s. It is sonically similar to the trap music subgenre and lyrically similar to the gangsta rap subgenre. Artists within drill music have been noted for their style of lyricism and association with crime in Chicago. The genre progressed into the American mainstream in 2012 following the success of rappers like Chief Keef, Lil Durk, Lil Reese, Fredo Santana, G Herbo and King Louie who had many local fans and a significant internet presence alongside producer Young Chop. Other rappers, such as LA Capone and RondoNumbaNine also contributed to the early drill scene. As the audience grew, media attention and the signing of drill musicians to major labels followed. Later, after the initial momentum from the early 2010s somewhat subsided, Chicago drill had a resurgence in the late 2010s, (c. 2018) with artists such as King Von, Polo G and a renewed Lil Durk. 

A regional subgenre UK drill emerged in London particularly in the district of Brixton, beginning in 2012. UK drill rose to prominence by mid-2012 and has influenced other regional scenes, such as Australian, Spanish, Irish, Dutch, and Brooklyn drill (re-introduced to Brooklyn in the late 2010s).

Chief Keef, in particular, is considered the primary progenitor and popularizer of drill music, responsible for bringing it to the mainstream.

Characteristics

The lyrics of drill tend to be violent and gritty. The Guardians Lucy Stehlik said "nihilistic drill reflects real life where its squeaky-clean hip-hop counterparts have failed." Drill lyrics strongly contrast with the subject matter of earlier Chicago rappers and contemporary mainstream hip hop which at the time of drill's emergence tended to glorify and celebrate a rise to wealth.

Drill lyrics typically reflect life on the streets, and tend to be gritty, violent, realistic and nihilistic. Drill rappers use a grim, deadpan delivery, often filtered through Auto-Tune, influenced by the "stoned, aimless warbling of Soulja Boy (one of the earliest non-local Keef collaborators) and Lil Wayne before him." Atlanta-based rappers Gucci Mane and Waka Flocka Flame were important influences on the drill scene. Though it bears many similarities to trap music the speed of a drill beat is generally slower with a moderate tempo having about 60 to 70 beats per minute. Some producers work at double tempo such as 120 to 140 beats per minute.

Drillers tend to be young; many prominent musicians in the scene started getting attention while still in their teens. One of the genre's most prominent musicians, Chief Keef, was 16 when he signed a multi-million dollar record contract with Interscope, and in an extreme example, Lil Wayne co-signed the 13-year-old driller Lil Mouse. Critics have noted drill rappers' lack of concern with metaphor or wordplay. Chief Keef said that his simplistic flow is a conscious stylistic choice: "I know what I'm doing. I mastered it. And I don't even really use metaphors or punchlines. 'Cause I don't have to. But I could. ... I think that's doing too much. I'd rather just say what's going on right now. ... I don't really like metaphors or punchlines like that." Whet Moser wrote that Keef's songs are "lyrically, rhythmically, and emotionally diminished, which is why they sound so airless and claustrophobic ... It's not even fatalistic, because that would imply a self-consciousness, a moral consideration, that isn't there in the lyrics. It just is, over and over again." A profile on the scene in The New York Times examined the genre's aggression:

With rare exception this music is unmediated and raw and without bright spots, focused on anger and violence. The instinct is to call this tough, unforgiving and concrete-hard music joyless, but in truth it's exuberant in its darkness. Most of its practitioners are young and coming into their creative own against a backdrop of outrageous violence in Chicago, particularly among young people—dozens of teenagers have been killed in Chicago this year—and often related to gangs. (There's a long history of overlap between Chicago’s gangs and Chicago’s rap.) That their music is a symphony of ill-tempered threats shouldn't be a surprise.

Stehlik called drill production style the "sonic cousin to skittish footwork, southern-fried hip-hop and the 808 trigger-finger of trap." Young Chop is frequently identified by critics as the genre's most characteristic producer. The sound of trap producer Lex Luger's music is a major influence on drill, and Young Chop identified Shawty Redd, Drumma Boy, and Zaytoven as important precursors to drill.

History
David Drake of Complex said drill is not defined by any particular production style, but "is about the entirety of the culture: the lingo, the dances, the mentality, and the music, much of which originated in 'Dro City', a gang-defined territory of city blocks in the Woodlawn neighborhood."

In street slang, "drill" means to fight or retaliate, and "can be used for anything from females getting dolled up to all out war in the streets." Dro City rapper Pac Man, considered the stylistic originator of the genre, is credited as the first to apply the term to the local hip hop music.

Drake described the drill scene as a major vehicle of the early 2010s rise of Chicago hip hop, and described the scene as a grassroots movement that had incubated in a closed, interlocking system: on the streets and through social media in a network of clubs and parties and amongst high schools. Drill developed on the South Side of Chicago, in the midst of escalating violence and a homicide crisis. Mark Guarino wrote for Salon that the music grew during "a shift from historic feuding between monolithic crime organizations controlling thousands of members each to intrapersonal squabbling and retaliatory conflicts among smaller hybrid groups whose control extends just a few blocks... The toughened reality of living in these neighborhoods is what shaped Drill music." In the drill scene, rap conflict and gang conflict overlap, and many of the young rappers come from backgrounds with experience of violence. The Independents Sam Gould wrote that Chief Keef "represents both a scary strain of current hip hop culture and a seriously alienated group within American society."

YouTube was a platform for many drill rappers to release their music videos on, and ultimately significantly contributed to the genre's popularity. Chief Keef is considered the primary progenitor and popularizer of drill music, responsible for bringing it to the mainstream. In 2011 and 2012, he recorded multiple singles,  including "Love Sosa", "I Dont Like" and "Bang", which became viral hits, and was subsequently offered a deal from Interscope Records. Around the same time, King Louie, another drill rapper, was given a record deal from Epic Records.

By late 2012, rappers from other scenes and hip hop stars like Kanye West, Drake and Rick Ross were collaborating with drill musicians. Kanye West remixed "I Don't Like" for the 2012 GOOD Music compilation Cruel Summer as "Don't Like", with features from West, Chief Keef, Pusha T, Big Sean and Jadakiss. West cited drill as an influence on his 2013 album Yeezus, and Chief Keef and King Louie had vocals featured on the album.

Drill's subject matter strongly contrasts with that of earlier Chicago rappers such as Kid Sister, Lupe Fiasco, Psalm One, Rhymefest and The Cool Kids.

Older Chicago rappers have been mixed in their reaction to drill's popularity and violence. In a radio interview, rapper Lupe Fiasco said "Chief Keef scares me. Not him specifically, but just the culture that he represents ... The murder rate in Chicago is skyrocketing, and you see who's doing it and perpetrating it—they all look like Chief Keef." After Chief Keef threatened Fiasco on Twitter, Fiasco said he was considering quitting the music scene. Rhymefest tweeted that drill is "the theme music to murder."

Chief Keef's debut album, "Finally Rich", released on Interscope Records in late 2012, was subsequently described as a "classic" album in the genre. Despite the warm critique, "Finally Rich" only sold 50,000 units and became a flop record which resulted in record labels subsequently losing interest in drill, deeming it a "fad".

While drill music of Chicago fizzled out of mainstream popularity, a new scene was emerging in the UK and by the late-2010s was gaining mainstream popularity, spreading across Europe, influencing the creation of drill scenes around the continent. UK drill music evolved its own distinct style of production compared to Chicago drill with UK drill group 67 often credited for shifting the sound away from the Chicago influences it seemed to heavily draw inspiration from in its early days and foundation and for forming a more homegrown sound, with LD - a member of 67 - being named as the godfather of UK drill. The mid-2010s saw the emergence of Chicago-influenced Brooklyn drill artists such as Bobby Shmurda and Rowdy Rebel, while the late 2010s saw the emergence of new prominent drill artists from Brooklyn such as Pop Smoke, Sheff G, Fivio Foreign, Sleepy Hallow and 22Gz.

Later Brooklyn drill production is heavily influenced by UK drill (the latter of which brings production influences from grime and UK garage) with artists such as Fivio Foreign, Sheff G, Smoove’L, Bizzy Banks, 22Gz, and Pop Smoke collaborating with UK drill producers such as 808Melo, Yamaica Productions, Yoz Beats, Tommyprime and AXL Beats. Pop Smoke's song "Welcome to the Party", produced by 808Melo was a prominent release in 2019 and saw remixes from Nicki Minaj, Meek Mill and British MC Skepta. Sheff G's "No Suburban" (released in 2017) and 22Gz's "Suburban" (released in 2016) have been credited for bringing attention to later Brooklyn drill.

Controversy

In 2022, some connected the pro-gun content of the genre to real world gun violence on the streets of New York and other major cities, given the violence surrounding a number of drill artists like the late Tdott Woo, the late Pop Smoke, the late Chii Wvttz, and gun violence victim Nas Blixky.  A shooting by alleged attempted murderer C Blu, who is signed to Interscope Records, also gave rise to concerns, echoing the 1990s era gangsta rap controversy.

In response to the epidemic of death arising out of the diss elements in the scene,
in early 2022 a number of prominent New York DJs and music influencers, including DJ Drewski at Hot 97, Joe Budden, Ebro Darden of "Ebro in the Morning" on  Hot 97, D Teck, and
Power 105.1's DJ Gabe P either vowed to stop playing gang/diss records or re-iterated their refusal to play such content.

DJ Drewski told Complex that several young artists had told him they themselves did not want to include inflammatory disses in their drill work, being concerned about fueling neighborhood violence, but that such tracks were ultimately what got attention on YouTube.

On February 12, 2022, NYC mayor Eric Adams staunchly criticized drill music arguing that it is instigating violence. Days later, he met with drill rappers in attempt to come to an agreement about the music.

Influence

UK drill is a subgenre of drill music and road rap that originated in the South London district of Brixton from 2012 onwards. Borrowing heavily from the style of Chicago drill music, UK drill artists often rap about violent and hedonistic criminal lifestyles. Typically, those who create this style of music are affiliated with gangs or come from socioeconomically deprived neighborhoods where crime is a way of life for many. UK drill music is closely related to road rap, a British style of gangsta rap that became popular in the years prior to the existence of drill. Musically, UK drill often exhibits violent language and provocative lyrics.

References 

2010s in American music
2010s in British music
2010s in Australian music
2010s in London
Drill music
Criticism of hip-hop
Music of Chicago
Music of New York City
Music in London
African-American music
Hip hop genres
Trap music